The Campaign to raise the speed of railway travel in China or the China Railway Speed Up Campaign (中国铁路大提速) was a series of initiatives undertaken by the Ministry of Railways from 1997 to 2007 to increase the speed of train travel in China by improving the nation's railways. The campaign was implemented in six rounds and increased average speed of passenger trains in China from 43 km/h to 70 km/h.

Overview

In 1993, commercial train service in China averaged only  and was steadily losing market share to airline and highway travel on the country's expanding network of expressways. The MOR focused modernization efforts on increasing the service speed and capacity on existing lines through double-tracking, electrification, improvements in grade (through tunnels and bridges), reductions in turn curvature, and installation of continuous welded rail.

A notable example is the Guangzhou-Shenzhen Railway, which in December 1994 became the first line in China to offer sub-high speed service of 160 km/h using domestically produced DF-class diesel locomotives. After the completion of a third track in 2000 and a fourth in 2007, the line became the first in China to run high-speed passenger and freight service on separate tracks.
In all, travel speed was increased on 22,000 extended km (13,700 extended mi), or one fifth, of the national rail network, and the average speed of a passenger train improved to 70 km/h. The introduction of more non-stop service between large cities also helped to reduce travel time. The non-stop express train from Beijing to Fuzhou shortened travel time from 33.5 to less than 20 hours.

In addition to track and scheduling improvements, the deployment of the CRH series trains raised travel speed. During the sixth railway speedup campaign, 52 CRH trainsets (CRH1, CRH2 and CRH5) were put into operation, service as 280 train numbers. By the end of 2007, there were planned to have 158 CRH trainsets, 514 train numbers in operation.  The new trains sliced 2 hours off of the 1,463 km trip between Beijing and Shanghai to a journey of just under 10 hours. Travel times from Shanghai to Changsha (1,199 km) fell by 1.5 hour to 7.5 hours and the trip to Nanchang was halved.

Summary
The Six "Speed-Up" campaigns (1997–2007)

Sixth Round
Following the sixth round of the "railway speed up campaign" on April 18, 2007, some 6,003 extended km of track could carry trains at speeds of up to 200 km/h. Of these, 848 km could attain 250 km/h. These include the Qinhuangdao-Shenyang (Qinshen) Passenger Railway, which was initially built for 200 km/h trains when completed in 2003 and then upgraded to 250 km/h during the Sixth Speed-up Campaign, and sections of the Qingdao-Jinan (Jiaoji), Shanghai-Kunming (Hukun) (between Shanghai and Zhuzhou), Guangzhou-Shenzhen (Guangshen), Beijing-Shanghai (Jinghu), Beijing-Harbin (Jingha), Beijing-Guangzhou (Jingguang), Longhai (between Zhengzhou to Xuzhou) Railways. Upgrade work continues on other lines including the Wuhan-Danyang (Handan), Hunan-Guizhou (Xianggui), and Nanjing-Nantong (Ningqi) Railways.

Upgraded High-Speed Rail Tracks After the Sixth Speed-Up Campaign (2007-04-18)
(Capable of Accommodating Train Speeds of 200+ km/h)

References

High-speed rail in China